Echineulima leucophaes is a species of sea snail, a marine gastropod mollusk in the family Eulimidae.

Description
The shell is rather large compared to other species within the family Eulimidae, with the average specimen measuring approximately 10 mm in length.

References

External links
 To World Register of Marine Species

Eulimidae
Gastropods described in 1913